Elsa Skarbøvik (born 3 November 1948 in Oslo) is a Norwegian politician for the Christian Democratic Party.

She was elected to the Norwegian Parliament from Vestfold in 1997, and was re-elected on one occasion. She had previously served in the position of deputy representative during the term 1985–1989.

Skarbøvik was a member of Sem municipality council from 1975 to 1985, serving the last two years as deputy mayor. She was also a member of Vestfold county council during the term 1979–1983.

References

1948 births
Living people
Christian Democratic Party (Norway) politicians
Members of the Storting
Women members of the Storting
21st-century Norwegian politicians
21st-century Norwegian women politicians
20th-century Norwegian politicians
20th-century Norwegian women politicians